Sean Desmond McLoughlin (born 13 November 1996) is an Irish professional footballer who plays for Hull City as a defender.

Club career
Born in Cork, McLoughlin signed for Cork City in 2013 after previously playing for Springfield Ramblers. He moved to College Corinthians in 2015, returning to Cork City in 2017 after a spell with UCC. He made his debut for Cork City in October 2017. He signed a new 18 month contract in July 2018.

McLoughlin signed for Hull City in July 2019. He moved on loan to Scottish club St Mirren later that month. McLoughlin was an ever-present for St Mirren in the first part of the 2019–20 Scottish Premiership season, and returned to Hull at the end of the loan on 31 December 2019.

He made his first start for Hull on 8 February 2020 in a 1–1 draw away to Reading.

On 5 March 2021, McLoughlin signed a new three-year contract with Hull City.

International career
McLoughlin has represented Ireland at under-21 level.

Playing style
Primarily a central defender, McLoughlin made his debut in October 2017 as a left-back.

Career statistics

References

1996 births
Living people
Republic of Ireland association footballers
Cork City F.C. players
College Corinthians A.F.C. players
Hull City A.F.C. players
St Mirren F.C. players
League of Ireland players
Scottish Professional Football League players
Association football defenders
Republic of Ireland under-21 international footballers
English Football League players